The 2nd Yerevan Golden Apricot International Film Festival was a film festival held in Yerevan, Armenia from 12–17 July 2005.  Entries were submitted from 45 countries such as Russia, Argentina, the Netherlands,  Afghanistan, Malaysia, Chile, Turkey, Finland, India, Israel, Iran and Canada. Following the selection, 144 films from 37 countries were included into competition and non-competition programs. Included amongst the guests and participants were some of the most highly acclaimed figures of world cinema such as Abbas Kiarostami, Krzysztof Zanussi, and Nikita Mikhalkov who were given Lifetime Achievement Awards. The main prizewinners of the 2nd Golden Apricot Festival were Alexander Sokurov, Russia, with his film The Sun (Feature Film Competition), Pirjo Honkasalo, Finland, with The 3 Rooms of Melancholia (Documentary Competition), and Arman Yeritsyan, Armenia, with Under the Open Sky (Armenian Panorama Competition).

About the Golden Apricot Yerevan International Film Festival 
The Golden Apricot Yerevan International Film Festival (GAIFF) is an annual film festival held in Yerevan, Armenia. The festival was founded in 2004 with the co-operation of the “Golden Apricot” Fund for Cinema Development, the Armenian Association of Film Critics and Cinema Journalists. The GAIFF is continually supported by the Ministry of Foreign Affairs of the RA, the Ministry of Culture of the RA and the Benevolent Fund for Cultural Development.The objectives of the festival are "to present new works by the film directors and producers in Armenia and foreign cinematographers of Armenian descent and to promote creativity and originality in the area of cinema and video art".

Awards GAIFF 2005

See also 
 Golden Apricot Yerevan International Film Festival
 Serge Avedikian
 Atom Egoyan
 Abbas Kiarostami
 Krzysztof Zanussi
 Nikita Mikhalkov
 Cinema of Armenia
 2005 in film

References

Golden Apricot International Film Festival,02
2005 in Armenia
2005 film festivals
2005 festivals in Asia
2005 festivals in Europe